Wings from Above is a 2010 short comedy film directed by Pablo Herrera and starring Chris Hendren. It won the award for Best Film in Red Bull Art of Can 2010.

Premise
A man is given extraordinary energy and uses it to do good for mankind.

Cast
 Chris Hendren - Main Character
 Pedro Rodriguez - Mugger
 Jeremy Caldwell - Mugger
 Lili Rodriguez - Victim

References

External links

 http://vimeo.com/11365894 - Wings from Above on Vimeo

2010 films
2010 comedy films
American comedy short films
2010 short films
2010s English-language films
2010s American films